Kim Cheol-hyeon (born 25 June 1959) is a South Korean weightlifter. He competed in the men's middle heavyweight event at the 1984 Summer Olympics.

References

1959 births
Living people
South Korean male weightlifters
Olympic weightlifters of South Korea
Weightlifters at the 1984 Summer Olympics
Place of birth missing (living people)
Asian Games medalists in weightlifting
Weightlifters at the 1982 Asian Games
Asian Games bronze medalists for South Korea
Medalists at the 1982 Asian Games
20th-century South Korean people
21st-century South Korean people